Merlin Sereld Victor Gilbert Hay, 24th Earl of Erroll (born 20 April 1948), is a crossbench member of the House of Lords, chief of the Scottish clan Hay, and hereditary Lord High Constable of Scotland.

Early life and education
Lord Erroll, elder son of Diana Hay, 23rd Countess of Erroll and Sir Iain Moncreiffe of that Ilk, was a Page to the Lord Lyon in 1956. He was educated at Eton College before going up to Trinity College, Cambridge.

Earl of Erroll 
Succeeding his mother, the Countess, in 1978 as Earl of Erroll, and in 1985, his father as a baronet, Lord Erroll now serves as a member of the Council of the Hereditary Peerage Association. Whilst Lord Erroll inherited Chieftainship of Clan Hay via his mother, their father's Chieftainship of Clan Moncreiffe devolved to his younger brother Peregrine.

Marriage and family
He married Isabelle Jacqueline Laline Astell Hohler (Brussels, 22 August 1955 – 13 January 2020), daughter of Major Thomas Sidney Hohler and his wife, heiress to the Astell family, of Everton House, Bedfordshire, in 1982. The Countess was a Patroness of the Royal Caledonian Ball and served as High Sheriff of Bedfordshire in 2015.

The Earl and Countess had two sons and two daughters:
 Harry Thomas William Hay, Lord Hay (b. Basingstoke, 8 August 1984); married Clementine Travis in 2017.
 Lady Amelia Diana Jacqueline Hay (b. Basingstoke, 23 November 1986)
 Lady Laline Lucy Clementine Hay (b. Basingstoke, 21 December 1987); married Major Jeremy Sudlow in 2017.
 Hon. Richard Merlin Iain Astell (b. Basingstoke, 14 December 1990); took the surname "Astell" by Royal Licence in 2015.

Military and business career
The Earl of Erroll became a Lieutenant at the Atholl Highlanders since 1974, and is a Member of the Royal Company of Archers. He served in the 21st SAS Artists Rifles (V) Territorial Army from 1975 to 1990, and was an Honorary Colonel of the Royal Military Police (Territorial Army) from 1992 to 1997.

Lord Erroll has worked as a marketing and computer consultant, is a Freeman of the City of London, and Prime Warden of the Worshipful Company of Fishmongers (2000–01). He continues to head the Puffin's Club, founded by his father. He was President of ERADAR, an e-business consultancy, and is Chairman of the Digital Policy Alliance (EURIM).

He was a director of LASSeO, a not-for-profit technical standardization and interoperability membership organisation for smartcard technologies.

Politics
Lord Erroll was one of 90 excepted hereditary peers elected to remain in the House of Lords following the House of Lords Act 1999. A programmer and system designer by trade, he sits as a crossbencher and usually speaks on matters relating to cybersecurity and information technology. He was a member of the Science and Technology Committee and criticised Gordon Brown's government for what he said was a failure to curb cybercrime after four government agencies, including the Ministry of Defence and HM Revenue and Customs, reported massive losses of data in 2008. Most recently he was a member of the Information Committee from 2007 to 2012.

See also
 Earl of Erroll

References

External links
 Burke's Peerage & Baronetage
 
 Official Profile on the Parliament website
 Earl of Erroll Open Rights Group

1948 births
Living people
People from Sandy, Bedfordshire
People educated at Eton College
Alumni of Trinity College, Cambridge
Special Air Service officers
Crossbench hereditary peers
24
Scottish clan chiefs
Members of the Royal Company of Archers
Artists' Rifles officers
Royal Military Police officers
20th-century British Army personnel
Prime Wardens of the Worshipful Company of Fishmongers
Hereditary peers elected under the House of Lords Act 1999